Cooperation Jackson is an emerging network of worker cooperatives in Jackson, Mississippi, United States. It aims to develop a series of independent but connected democratic institutions to empower workers and residents of Jackson, particularly to address the needs of poor, unemployed, Black and Latino residents. The development of Cooperation Jackson was heavily inspired by the Mondragon Corporation in Spain, which is also a federation of cooperatives, and by historical cooperative movements as described in works by W. E. B. Du Bois and in the book Collective Courage by Jessica Gordon Nembhard.

History 
Cooperation Jackson, formed in 2014, enacts a vision of a radically democratic city of interconnected cooperatives and supporting institutions. Although the city of Jackson was already home to the Mississippi Association of Cooperatives, before Cooperation Jackson, there were not many existing cooperative businesses. Kali Akuno, a Cooperation co-founder and co-director, describes a goal of bringing a strong focus of cooperative economics to an urban American context, as opposed to the currently more common rural context of agricultural and utility co-ops.

The organization has attempted to work within and outside of the government to achieve its goals. It has had to fight off anti-democratic measures by the Mississippi state legislators including austerity measures, an attempted takeover of Jackson–Medgar Wiley Evers International Airport, and an attempt to pass a bill to hand control of the city government over to the governor. The organizers also struggle with working in an economically depressed city in the poorest state in the United States.

Jackson-Kush Plan 
Akuno has described the network as a key part of enacting the Jackson-Kush Plan. The plan, which was developed by the Malcolm X Grassroots Movement and the Jackson People's Assembly, involves building a strong base of community wealth, stability, racial equity, and economic democracy in Jackson. It has three planks, which are the "building of a broad-based solidarity economy, the building of people's assemblies, and the building of an independent black political party."

Organizers behind Cooperation Jackson believe that a solidarity economy rooted in democratic principles is a core requirement of developing the community's capacity and vision in making meaningful change. The Jackson-Kush Plan describes the role of this economy as a "transitional strategy and praxis to build 21st century socialism and advance the abolition of capitalism and the poverty and oppressive social relations that it fosters". The direct democracy of people's assemblies and local government electoral strategy are designed to both benefit and benefit from a strong cooperative system.

Projects

Mutual aid 
Cooperation Jackson has long focused on facilitating mutual aid projects. This has included creating and distributing personal protective equipment and providing an eviction support hotline in the wake of the COVID-19 pandemic. Members have also created community gardens and composting sheds on vacant spaces to aid their goal of providing enough organic food to provide for the calorie needs of 20,000 people in Jackson.

In 2021, Cooperation organizers began work with the Grassroots Center in Vermont to develop a land trust in that state in cooperation with the local indigenous population and to address food needs with regenerative agriculture. The project also seeks to serve as a safe haven for potential climate refugees who may be escaping inhospitable conditions in Mississippi.

Cooperative institutions 
Several cooperatives exist as part of the Cooperation Jackson network. These include the lawn care business The Green Team, the organic vegetable farm Freedom Farms, and the print shop The Center for Community Production, which also operates a 3D printer. These cooperatives try to alleviate causes of poverty and discrimination while operating in an ecologically sustainable manner. A cooperative incubator exists, called the Balagoon Center. Cooperation Jackson also owns about three hectares of land which it operates as a community land trust.

External links 

 Official website
 The Jackson-Kush Plan: The Struggle for Black Self-Determination and Economic Democracy

References 

Cooperative federations
Land trusts
Business incubators
Labor rights groups
Worker cooperatives of the United States
Cooperative movement